Valentin Uritescu (4 June 1941 – 17 June 2022) was a Romanian film, television, and theatre actor. He is best known for his parts in The Conjugal Bed and The Last Assault.

In 2011, Uritescu was chosen by Sony Pictures Animation to dub Grandsanta in Romanian in the animated film Arthur Christmas, King in the Cinderella movie from Disney, and many animated characters.

Selected filmography
 Fructul oprit (2018) – Katia's father
 Scene de căsnicie (2008) 
 Războiul sexelor (2007) – Horia's father
 Cu un pas înainte (2007) – Septimiu Baltag 
 Exam (2003) – Nea Grigore
 The Conjugal Bed (1993 film)  
 The Last Assault'' (1985) – sergeant Șaptefrați

References

External links

1941 births
2022 deaths
People from Cugir
Romanian male stage actors
Romanian male film actors
Romanian male television actors
Caragiale National University of Theatre and Film alumni
Recipients of the Order of Cultural Merit (Romania)